Zero-stability, also known as D-stability in honor of Germund Dahlquist, refers to the stability of a numerical scheme applied to the simple initial value problem .

A linear multistep method is zero-stable if all roots of the characteristic equation that arises on applying the method to  have magnitude less than or equal to unity, and that all roots with unit magnitude are simple.  This is called the root condition and means that the parasitic solutions of the recurrence relation will not grow exponentially.

Example
The following third-order method has the highest order possible for any explicit two-step method for solving :
. If  identically, this gives a linear recurrence relation with characteristic equation . Rounding errors in the computation of  would mean a nonzero (though small) value of  so that eventually the parasitic solution  would dominate. Therefore, this method is not zero-stable.

References

Numerical differential equations